Zebra striping is the coloring of every other row of a table to make it easier to read. Although zebra striping has been used for a long time to improve readability, there is relatively little data on how much it helps.

CSS
Zebra striping can be implemented using Cascading Style Sheets (CSS).

Shading technique

The term zebra striping is also used for a diagnostic shading technique used in computer graphics to visualize curvature on smooth surfaces.  It is primarily used for computer aided design (CAD), where it helps checking that surfaces meet smoothly.   It is a simulation of the visual effect of placing an object in a tunnel lit by parallel rows of lights, or a perfectly reflecting object in a room with striped walls. It has been implemented in a number of CAD and non-CAD products, including (but not limited to) Fusion 360, Autodesk Inventor, AutoCAD, Rhinoceros 3D, and Maya.

It can be implemented as an environment map using radiating pie wedges as the source texture.

See also 
 Checkerboard
 Green bar paper, continuous sheets pre-printed with green rows, once-common stationery used when physically printing tabular data
 Level-set method

References 

Shading